Locatelli is a Lombard surname.

Geographical distribution
As of 2014, 66.7% of all known bearers of the surname Locatelli were residents of Italy (frequency 1:1,705), 15.9% of Brazil (1:24,007), 9.5% of France (1:13,015), 2.7% of Argentina (1:29,519), 1.8% of the United States (1:372,424) and 1.5% of Switzerland (1:10,189).

In Italy, the frequency of the surname was higher than national average (1:1,705) only in one region: Lombardy (1:296)

People
 Andrea Locatelli (1695–1741), Italian painter
 Achille Locatelli (1856–1935), Italian cardinal
 Achille Locatelli (painter) (1864–1948), Italian painter and writer of art biographies
 Aldo Locatelli (1915–1962), Italian painter
 Alessio Locatelli (born 1978), Italian football goalkeeper
 Andrea Locatelli (motorcyclist) (born 1996), Italian motorcycle racer
 Antonio Locatelli (1895–1936), Italian aviator and journalist
 Elio Locatelli (1943–2019), Italian speed skater
 Eustachio Locatelli (died 1575), Roman Catholic prelate, Bishop of Reggio Emilia
 Francesco Locatelli (1920–1978), Italian racing cyclist
 Gabriele Moreno Locatelli (1959–1993), Italian pacifist 
 Giorgio Locatelli (born 1963), Italian chef working in the UK
 Giovan Francesco Locatelli (1810–1882), Italian painter
 Giovanni Battista Locatelli (disambiguation), several people
 John Baptist Locatelli (1735-1805) Italian sculptor
 Manuel Locatelli (born 1998), Italian footballer
 Maria Cattarina Locatelli (or Lucatelli; died 1723), Italian painter
 Paul Locatelli (1938–2010), American Jesuit and president of Santa Clara University
 Pietro Locatelli (1695–1764), Italian Baroque composer and violinist
 Roberto Locatelli (born 1974), Italian motorcycle racer
 Rolando Locatelli (born 1949), Argentine Olympic rowing cox
 Tatiana Locatelli (born 1979), Italian ski mountaineer
 Tomas Locatelli (born 1976), Italian international footballer
 Ugo Locatelli (1916–1993), Italian footballer

See also
 Locanda Locatelli, Giorgio Locatelli's Michelin-starred restaurant in London
 Locatelli is the trademark of a popular brand of Pecorino Romano cheese (which is owned in the United States by the Italian company Auricchio SpA) 
 Locatelli is one of the brands of the group Lactalis under which mostly fresh cheeses are produced.
 Lucatelli

References

Italian-language surnames
Surnames of Italian origin